RAF Travellers Hill is a small village near Two Boats, Ascension Island, built to house RAF personnel working on RAF Ascension Island.

References 

Ascension Island
Travellers Hill